Disney's Magical Mirror Starring Mickey Mouse is a 2002 point-and-click adventure video game developed by Capcom and published by Nintendo for the GameCube & licensed from Disney.

Gameplay
The game uses a simple point-and-click mechanic, similar to Pac-Man 2: The New Adventures, which involves using a cursor to guide Mickey Mouse to various locations. Mickey will react to what the player does and what he encounters in the game by expressing curiosity, getting mad, falling down, running away, standing his ground, or other actions. At certain points, the player is able to have Mickey perform a special move that generally involves having him stomp on an onscreen enemy.

Mini-games, such as having Mickey fly an airplane or ski down a mountain, are available throughout the game. Special souvenirs may be uncovered as well, which are displayed in Mickey's room at the end of the game, such as Pluto's collar or Minnie's bow. The objective of the game is to find all the pieces of the mirror so that Mickey goes back home.

Plot
One night when Mickey is fast asleep, he falls into a dream where a mischievous ghost traps a dream vision of himself inside a magic mirror. Stuck in a large mansion within an alternate universe that strangely resembles his own house, Mickey yearns to get back through the mirror to the real world in order to wake up from his dreamlike state; however, the ghost destroys the mirror and the pieces shrink and fly off to different areas around the house, which turns the magic mirror into a normal mirror. The player must direct Mickey to outwit and pull gags in order to get past enemies, obstacles, and the aforementioned ghost and recover the twelve broken mirror pieces he needs to go home again and search for twelve magic star containers (needed to pull gags) and items needed to help him throughout his quest. Whenever he finds a piece, it will fly back to the mirror, return to its normal size, and put itself back in place.

After repairing the mirror, Mickey prepares to leave, but the ghost stops him, revealing that it only brought him here so it can have someone to play with. The player could either choose to stay or go. Choosing to stay will make the ghost run off, leaving Mickey stuck in the alternate world until he reenters the mirror room where the player can choose to stay or leave again. If the player chooses to leave, Mickey says goodbye to the ghost and begins to go home, but the ghost decides to go with him (only if the player has collected all the mirror pieces). After Mickey wakes up, he goes downstairs to get something to eat. If the player repairs the mirror with all twelve pieces found, a model of the ghost is shown hanging on the ceiling fan and the ghost's laughter is heard, implying that the ghost is now residing in Mickey's house.

Development
The game was teased at Nintendo's Space World 2001 presentation with a series of screenshots, which was assumed to be a platformer like much the vein of Disney's Magical Quest on the Super NES. The title was formally announced at the 2002 Electronic Entertainment Expo.

The game's introduction sequence is loosely based on Thru the Mirror, a 1936 Mickey Mouse cartoon; Mickey's animations are replicated from the short. An alternate scene later in the game, where Mickey grows to a tremendous size then shrinks to a minuscule size, was also replicated as in the cartoon.

Reception

The game received "mixed or average" reviews, according to review aggregator Metacritic. For the most part, the player is given no instructions and cut scenes are limited to watching Mickey get chased or falling through to the next area.

See also
 Disney's Hide and Sneak
 List of Disney video games

Notes

References

2002 video games
Disney games by Capcom
Disney video games
GameCube games
GameCube-only games
Games with GameCube-GBA connectivity
Mickey Mouse video games
Nintendo games
Point-and-click adventure games
Single-player video games
Video games about dreams
Video games about ghosts
Video games about magic
Video games about parallel universes
Video games developed in Japan